Mesosella is a genus of longhorn beetles of the subfamily Lamiinae, containing the following species:

 Mesosella kumei Takakuwa, 1984
 Mesosella simiola Bates, 1884

References

Pteropliini